Nu tändas tusen juleljus is a 2008 Christmas album by Åsa Jinder.

Track listing
Betlehems stjärna (Alice Tegnér)
Nu tändas tusen juleljus (Emmy Köhler)
Laudate Dominum (Wolfgang Amadeus Mozart)
I himmelen (trad.)
När det lider mot jul (Det strålar en stjärna) (Ruben Liljefors)
Bereden väg för Herran (Frans Michael Franzén)
Dagen är kommen (Adeste Fideles) (John Francis Wade)
Maria går i rosengård (Max Reger)
Away in a Manger (William J. Kirkpatrick, arr. Lennart Sjöholm)
Julvisa (Jean Sibelius)
Jul, jul, strålande jul (Gustaf Nordqvist)
Stilla natt (Stille Nacht, heilige Nacht) (Franz Gruber)

Contributors
Åsa Jinder - nyckelharpa, arranger, producer
Nicke Widén - dobro
Emil Skogh - double-bass

References 

2008 Christmas albums
Christmas albums by Swedish artists
Folk Christmas albums
Åsa Jinder albums